Sanderella is a genus of flowering plants from the orchid family, Orchidaceae, native to South America. Two species are recognized at present (June 2014):

Sanderella discolor (Barb.Rodr.) Cogn. in C.F.P.von Martius & auct. suc.  - Brazil, Bolivia, Argentina
Sanderella riograndensis Dutra - Brazil, Argentina

See also 
 List of Orchidaceae genera

References

External links 
Swiss Orchid Foundation at Herbarium Jany Renz, Sanderella discolor 

Oncidiinae genera
Orchids of South America
Oncidiinae